Proto-Afro-Asiatic may refer to
Proto-Afro-Asiatic language, the reconstructed common ancestor of the Afro-Asiatic languages
Proto-Afro-Asiatic Urheimat, theories concerning the original homeland of Afro-Asiatic